The Public Health Service Citation Medal is a decoration of the United States Public Health Service presented to members of the United States Public Health Service Commissioned Officer Corps and to members of any Uniformed Services of the United States whose accomplishments or achievements are of outstanding or unique significance to the missions of the Corps. It is the tenth-highest award awarded by the United States Public Health Service Commissioned Corps.

Criteria
The PHS Achievement Medal is awarded to an officer in recognition of a specific and noteworthy achievement, generally for a short period of time. This could include contributions toward accomplishing a program objective or high quality achievement, but at a lesser level than is required for the achievement medal.

See also
 Awards and decorations of the Public Health Service
 Awards and decorations of the United States government

References

United States Department of Health and Human Services
Achievement Medal